{{DISPLAYTITLE:K+-transporting ATPase}}

In enzymology, a K+-transporting ATPase is an enzyme that catalyzes the chemical reaction

ATP + H2O + K+out  ADP + phosphate + K+in

The 3 substrates of this enzyme are ATP, H2O, and K+, whereas its 3 products are ADP, phosphate, and K+.

This enzyme belongs to the family of hydrolases, specifically those acting on acid anhydrides to catalyse transmembrane movement of substances. The systematic name of this enzyme class is ATP phosphohydrolase (K+-importing). Other names in common use include K+-translocating Kdp-ATPase, and multi-subunit K+-transport ATPase. This enzyme participates in two-component system - general.

Structural studies

References

 
 

EC 3.6.3
Enzymes of known structure